Almoatasembellah Ali Mohamed Al-Musrati (born 6 April 1996), known simply as Al-Musrati, is a Libyan professional footballer who plays as a midfielder for Primeira Liga club Braga and the Libya national team.

Club career

Vitória de Guimarães

Reserve team 
In January 2017 he signed a three-and-a-half-year deal at Vitória de Guimarães of Portugal's Primeira Liga, on the recommendation of their former player Romano Sion. He began playing for their reserve team in LigaPro, and on 4 March 2018 scored his first goal to equalise in a 1–1 draw away to União.

First team 
On 5 August 2019, Al-Musrati made his debut for the first team, playing the full 90 minutes of a 1–0 win at Feirense in the second round of the Taça da Liga. Thirteen days later he made his Primeira Liga debut in a 1–1 home draw with Boavista and was third-place in the vote for the league's best midfielder of the month, behind Bruno Fernandes and Pizzi. On 12 December, he scored his only goal for the first team, equalising in a 3–2 comeback win at Eintracht Frankfurt in the group stage of the UEFA Europa League; his club was already eliminated.

Loan to Rio Ave 
Al-Musrati was loaned to Rio Ave of the same league on 29 January 2020, for the rest of the season. He, Diogo Figueiras and Nuno Santos were sent off on 17 June in a 2–1 home loss to Benfica.

Braga 
On 31 July 2020, Al-Musrati signed a four-year deal at Braga, joining his former Rio Ave manager Carlos Carvalhal. His first goal was on 26 November, to open a 3–3 home draw with Leicester City in the Europa League group stage; three days later he struck for the first time in the top flight to win at the Estádio Municipal de Braga against Farense. He was voted the league's Player of the Month for February 2021.

International career
Al-Musrati was first called up for Libya at the 2014 African Nations Championship in South Africa, and played all but one game including the penalty shootout win over Ghana in the final.

Career statistics

International
Scores and results list Libya's goal tally first, score column indicates score after each Elmusrati goal.

Honours
Braga
Taça de Portugal: 2020–21

Libya
African Nations Championship: 2014

References

External links
 
 

1996 births
People from Misrata
Living people
Libyan footballers
Libya international footballers
Association football midfielders
Al-Ittihad Club (Tripoli) players
Vitória S.C. B players
Vitória S.C. players
Rio Ave F.C. players
S.C. Braga players
Libyan Premier League players
Primeira Liga players
Liga Portugal 2 players
Libyan expatriate footballers
Libyan expatriate sportspeople in Portugal
Expatriate footballers in Portugal
Libya A' international footballers
2014 African Nations Championship players